Qeparo (Kiparo) is a seaside village in the municipality of Himara in Vlorë County, Albania. It is part of the Albanian Riviera and the village is divided in two parts – Upper or Old Qeparo on higher ground and Lower or New Qeparo on the coast.

Name
The first identified form of the name of the village is "Clapero" in the 1566 correspondence of the people of Himara who were seeking refuge from the Ottoman Empire with the Kingdom of Naples. The name is thought to derive from the word kllapë and the Greek suffix -erό, which is commonly used in toponyms (e.g. Vromero). As "kllapë/klapa" has nearly the same meaning in the local Albanian and Greek dialects, the question arises as to whether the name is Greek or Albanian. The form Qeparo is a later innovation which was produced via vowel metathesis and the typical shift of /kl/ to /q/ in southern Albanian dialects. Oral and written historical accounts suggest that the original name of the village was Kiepero or Kiparos, which derives from the Greek word kipos, meaning garden. The connection with Greek kipos is a folk etymology.

History
Double axes of the Mycenaean Greek type that date from the late Bronze Age (1400-1100 BC) have been found in the location Shafka e Kudhësit between Qeparo and Kudhës in the 1977-78 site survey under the direction of archaeologist Frano Prendi. They belong to the IV-Buchholz/B1a-Deshayes Aegean sea group of Bronze Age metalworking.

In 1501, villages in the Himara region were governed by their own elders, and the traditional meeting place of the region was in the locality of Spilea, near the village of Qeparo. Certain villages enjoyed more privileges than others, as they were provided with Kapedana - hereditary leaders with military roles, particularly regarding recruitment. The Gjika family held this title in Qeparo, and a major by the name of Atanasio Gjika was mentioned in Neapolitan documents relating to the king's recruitments in the region during the end of the 18th century. Apart from these Kapedana, the villages in the Himara region did not have unique leaders, but rather a council made up of the heads of the local fis or brotherhoods known as primates in relevant documents.

In 1722, the villages of Himara, Palasa, Ilias, Vuno, Pilur and Qeparo refused to submit to the Pasha of Delvina. Eastern-rite missionary Giuseppe Schirò from the Arbëresh town of Piana degli Albanesi in Sicily, visited the Himara region in 1722 due to connections based on the founders of Piana degli Albanesi being from the region of Himara. In his report, Qeparo and other villages were described as Albanian ("di natione Albanesi"), while Palasa, Himara and Dhermi as Greek.

The village has an Orthodox Church dedicated to Saint Demetrius, dated 1760, one of the nine churches in Albania today dedicated to that saint. The church was erected at a period when pressure for conversion to Islam was strong. A project for the establishment of a Greek school in the village was initiated by the Greek national benefactors Evangelos and Konstantinos Zappas in 1860. In the 1898-1899 school season three Greek schools were operating in Qeparo: elementary, secondary and a girls' school with a total of 100 students.

During the period of the Balkan Wars, the inhabitants of Greek-speaking villages in the region, such as Qeparo, fought against Albanian speaking-villages like Kudhës, who fought on the side of the Ottoman Empire.

The Albanian government built the main road along the coast in 1957 and it boosted economic and other opportunities in the area. The water channel built near the road was a factor that made people over time settle near the sea, resulting in the village becoming split into parts, Old Qeparo and New Qeparo. Coastal New Qeparo is the hub of both villages where government services are located and social activities take place. In post communist Albania, some two thirds of the village population emigrated from Qeparo. The remaining people were involved in developing the village by constructing new homes and focusing on raising the quality of life. Later, the wider area became a tourist destination and New Qeparo has had to deal with problems related to uncontrolled urban sprawl and population growth. Emigration mostly impacted Old Qeparo whose population has declined, with many old houses being uninhabited and in various states of disrepair.

Geography

In ancient times, Qeparo was situated in the hill of Kasteli. Later on, its inhabitants settled a little further down, in the Gjivlash Slope, southeast of the hill of Kasteli, to be closer to their fields and to escape the cold of the winter. From 1957 onwards, Qeparo was split into the Old Village, and the New Village.

To the east, Qeparo is bounded by the village of Borsh, to the northeast by Çorraj, to the north with Kudhës, to the northwest by Piluri, to the west with the town of Himara and to the south and southwest by the Ionian sea. The Porto Palermo Castle, probably built by the Venetian and later used by Ali Pasha to guard against the Himariotes is part of the territory of Qeparo.

The village is composed of the following neighbourhoods or brotherhoods: Ballëguras, Bragjint' e Poshçërë, Bragjint' e Sipërmë, Dhimëgjonas, Gjikëbitaj, Mërtokaj, Ndregjin, Peçolat, Pogdan and Rushat. Every brotherhood had its own patron saint.

Qeparo has cultivated olives for centuries, as mentioned in the early 19th century in the work of François Pouqueville, Napoleon Bonaparte's general consul at the court of Ali Pasha in Ioannina.: testimony to this, are some centennial olive trees still existing in the village.

Demographics
Qeparo was in the past inhabited by Greek speakers and according to Georgios Giakoumis is indicated by the village name. During the interwar period, the inhabitants of Qeparo were Greek speaking. After 1957, the village developed into two parts, New Qeparo where the population became concentrated and Old Qeparo.

Qeparo in the early 1990s was mainly inhabited by an Albanian speaking population, many being Orthodox Christians. The village of Qeparo is mixed and contains both an Orthodox Albanian population inhabiting Qeparo Poshtme (lower neighbourhood) and Greeks living in Άνω Κηπαρό/Ano Kiparo (upper neighbourhood). Today the inhabitants of Qeparo mainly speak the Albanian Tosk dialect, with the exception of Upper Qeparo, where Greek speech is dominant. The Albanian local dialects, are part of southern Tosk, and more precisely, of the Labërisht sub-group. Labërisht itself is composed of non-unical language groups, and shares many features with the Arbëresh language which it is related to. In the early twenty first century, villagers are mainly concentrated in coastal New Qeparo, while the population of Old Qeparo has decreased to due to emigration with those remaining being some 80-100 elderly people.

Tourism
Qeparo is one of the favorite tourist destinations in Albania. Two hotels and a few guesthouses serve the tourists' enjoyment of the small beaches.

Notable people
 Persefoni Kokëdhima, Albanian Partisan, Hero of the People and member of Albanian National Liberation Movement
 Andon Qesari, Albanian actor and director.
 Georgios Stephanou, Greek Gendarmerie officer and revolutionary.
 Andrea Varfi, Albanian poet and nationalist.

See also

 Albanian Riviera
 Dhërmi
 Himara

References

Bibliography

Further reading
Widmann, Carlo Aurelio; Paladini, Filippo Maria (ed.): Dispacci da Corfù – 1794–1797. Venice, La Malcontenta, 1997.
İnalcık, Halil: Hicrî 835 Tarihli: Sûret-i Defter-i Sancak-i Arvanid [Copy of the Fiscal Survey for the Province of Arvanid (Albania), Year 1431 A.D.]. Metni bir Giriş ile Neşreden Halil İnalcik. Metin dışında H. 991 tarihli Avlonya Kanunnâmesi ile 1 harita, 29 tıpkı-basım vardır. (Türk Tarih Kurumu Yayınlarından XIV. Seri – No. 1. Tahrir defterleri.) Türk Tarih Kurumu Basımevi – Ankara. 1954, p. 27–28.
 Region of Himara: Official municipality website. 

Populated places in Himara
Populated places established in the 14th century
Albanian Ionian Sea Coast
Labëria
Greek communities in Albania
Villages in Vlorë County